Market Square in Miamisburg, Ohio is a square located at the intersection of Central Avenue and Main Street.  It is also the name of a  historic district including the square and more, that was listed on the National Register of Historic Places in 1975.

A date of significance for the location is 1850.  The district includes Second Empire, Italianate, and Queen Anne in 50 contributing buildings.

The Market Building, on the square, is a simple building with Greek Revival architecture elements, built in 1851.  It originally had an open ground floor with arched openings, used as a public marketplace.  The arched openings were later bricked in and used as a police station and jail.

The district includes buildings on both sides of Main Street, including at the junction with Central Avenue and at the junction at Linden Avenue.

References

Houses on the National Register of Historic Places in Ohio
Second Empire architecture in Ohio
Queen Anne architecture in Ohio
Italianate architecture in Ohio
Houses in Montgomery County, Ohio
National Register of Historic Places in Montgomery County, Ohio
Squares in Ohio
Historic districts on the National Register of Historic Places in Ohio